Zeppelin LZ 66, Imperial German Navy serial  L 23, took part in 51 reconnaissance missions during World War I and on 21 August 1917 it was shot down by Second Lt Bernard A. Smart, flying a Sopwith Pup.

Career
During WWI it took part in three attacks on England dropping  of bombs.

Bombing Boston 2/3. September 1916 
The night between 2 and 3 September 1916, L 23 from the base in Nordholz with the officers Ganzel and Rothe participated in World War I's largest bombing raid against England, involving a total of 12 Navy and four of the Army airships. L 23 threw seven bombs over the Boston area of Lincolnshire, with six hitting the city and one hitting Wyberton 3km southwest, causing one death.

Boarding of Royal
On April 23, 1917, L 23 brought the Norwegian ship Royal on the North Sea 85 miles off the Bovbjerg Lighthouse. They were able to stop the ship by dropping a bomb right in front of it, forcing its Norwegian crew to board the lifeboats. The airship then proceeded gently down the one lifeboat, where Commander Bockholt pleaded for the ship's papers and sent an officer and 5 sailors over to the sailing ship to investigate if the cargo ship was carrying contraband, namely illegal timber to England. 

A swiftly selected boarding party consisting of boatman Bernhard Wiesemann, chief mate Ernst Fegert and chief mate Friedrich Engelke took over the sailing ship. The Norwegian crew was initially locked in their quarters, but when the Germans struggled to maneuver the ship's sail, they were set free and ordered to sail the bark to Cuxhaven, where they arrived after 43 hours. This action was quite an achievement but it annoyed the German command as it put the Zeppelin at considerable risk while it hovered over the ship. 

There they confiscated and sold Royal, who then came to fly various German shipping companies both during and after the war until the ship in 1924 sold for scrap.

Destruction

On 21 August 1917, L 23 was observed at a distance by a northbound squadron of four smaller cruisers and 15 destroyers, having participated in an English mine laying operation off White Sands that morning.

Smart levelled off and saw that the stern of the zeppelin was ablaze, with the zeppelin at 45° nose high. The flames quickly spread up L 23, leaving only the nose intact when it hit the ocean.

No one from L 23 survived and the body of sailor Johan Schüttrup was found on 3 September 1917 on Vigsø Strand, being buried in Vigsø cemetery. It was written that he died for his German fatherland on his tombstone.

A heavily decomposed corpse, which was found in Jens Enevaldsens Strandlen in Søndervig on 15 September 1917 and was buried at Ny Sogn cemetery was reasonably identified as machine sailor Johannes / Hans Buhr, from a name-plate found with the body. In his graveyard in Harboøre, he has erected a tombstone in his honour. Many other unidentified corpses drifted ashore on the west coast during the time that may have been crew from L 23.

Pilot Bernard Arthur Smart ditched his Pup near two British destroyers and was rescued. Smart made a similar flight from HMS Yarmouth 11 months later when he led the air raid on 19 July 1918 on the zeppelin base at Tondern which destroyed LZ 99 & LZ 108.

See also
List of Zeppelins

Bibliography 

Notes

References 

 

 

 

Zeppelins
1910s German military transport aircraft
1910s German bomber aircraft
Hydrogen airships
Airships of the Imperial German Navy 
Aircraft first flown in 1916